Sven Hansson (1912–1971) was a Swedish country skier.

Sven Hansson may also refer to:
Sven Ove Hansson (born 1951), Swedish philosopher
Sven Lysholt Hansen (born 1945), Danish rower

See also
Sven Hanson (disambiguation)
Sven Hansen (1876–1958), Welsh shipowner and shipbuilder
Hansson (surname)